Daniele de Paoli (born 8 December 1973) is an Italian former professional racing cyclist. He rode in six editions of the Giro d'Italia.

Major results

1996
 2nd Overall Tour de Liège
1st Stages 2 & 7
 3rd Gran Premio Industria e Commercio Artigianato Carnaghese
 3rd Ruota d'Oro
1998
 7th Giro dell'Appennino
 8th Overall Giro d'Italia
1999
 3rd Giro dell'Appennino
 8th Overall Giro d'Italia
2000
 1st Giro d'Abruzzo
 3rd Tre Valli Varesine
 8th Klasika Primavera
 9th Züri-Metzgete
2001
 1st Stage 7 Volta a Catalunya
 3rd Road race, National Road Championships
 3rd Trofeo Matteotti
 5th Subida a Urkiola
2006
 1st Giro del Mendrisiotto

Grand Tour general classification results timeline

References

External links
 

1973 births
Living people
Italian male cyclists
Sportspeople from Pavia
Cyclists from the Province of Pavia
21st-century Italian people